Mayakkam Enna is a 2011 Indian Tamil-language psychological drama film written and directed by Selvaraghavan and produced by Gemini Film Circuit in association with Aum Productions its own banner. It stars his brother Dhanush, along with newcomer Richa Gangopadhyay, and features music scored by G. V. Prakash Kumar while the cinematography was handled by Ramji. The film revolves around an aspiring photographer and the problems he faces, causing him to fall into psychological distress. How he manages to achieve his goals from thereafter forms the rest of the story. 

The film was produced and distributed by Gemini Film Circuit, it was released on 25 November 2011 to critical acclaim but became an average hit at the box office.

Plot
Karthik Swaminathan, an introvert, referred to as 'Genius' by his friends, is a freelance photographer who aspires to become a wildlife photographer like Madhesh Krishnasamy. His friends Sunder Ramesh, Shankar, Padmini, and Vindhya  support him and his sister after the death of their parents.

One day, Sunder introduces Yamini as his girlfriend to Karthik and his friends. On their first meeting, Karthik and Yamini have a bitter experience but slowly develop a special bond. Karthik tries to stay away from Yamini since he does not want to break his friend's heart, but a sequence of events brings them closer. Eventually, Sunder's father arranges for Karthik and Yamini to be married.

After their wedding, Karthik learns that Madhesh had used a photograph that he had taken to win a national award. After this incident, he turns into a physically abusive alcoholic, and people start doubting his sanity and his mental health is somewhat affected. Yamini supports him, hoping that he will succeed one day. Days later when the residents of Karthik's house berate Karthik behind his back in front of Yamini, she gets angry and defensive and supports her husband. After watching TV where he sees Madhesh win an award for his photo, Karthik starts breaking the TV and accidentally pushes Yamini in a fit of rage. This leads to Yamini's miscarriage. Yamini returns a few days later from the hospital and stops talking to Karthik entirely. This makes Karthik come to terms with reality, and he mends his ways. He finally gets a break and becomes a professional wildlife photographer, and one of his photographs gets nominated for an International Photography Award, which he wins. On this occasion, Karthik thanks everyone for their support and Yamini for her faith in him and declares his love for her. Yamini finally relents and talks to Karthik as the film ends.

Cast
Dhanush as Karthik Swaminathan
Richa Gangopadhyay as Yamini Karthik (voiceover by Deepa Venkat)
Sunder Ramu as Sunder Ramesh
Mathivanan Rajendran as Shankar
Pooja Devariya as Padmini
Zara Barring as Ramya
Raviprakash as Madhesh Krishnasamy
Shilpi Kiran as Vindhya
Rajiv Choudhry as Ramesh

Production

Development 
Selvaraghavan began a film featuring Dhanush and Richa Gangopadhyay, who had initially been signed to do another film with him. Richa began shooting for the film in Kannur in May 2011, and the film was wrapped up within three months. The title was finally changed to Mayakkam Enna from 'Idhu Maalai Nerathu Mayakkam' in August 2011, with reports suggesting that Dhanush would sport four different looks in the film. Selvaraghavan has since made it clear that the film has a totally different script from the film that had been shelved. It was said that Dhanush would be seen in various stages, as a boy just out of his teenage to an old man.

Casting 
Yuvan Shankar Raja replaced G. V. Prakash Kumar as music composer in the film, with the latter reporting it was due to "money and time issues". However, in a sensational turn, G. V. Prakash Kumar was assigned again as composer after Yuvan Shankar Raja moved out of the project as he was busy with other commitments and could not give priority to Selvaraghavan, who was in rush to complete the film and move over to his next project, Vishwaroopam. On 24 May 2011, it was announced that Selvaraghavan was ousted from the project.

Music

The soundtrack, composed by G. V. Prakash Kumar in his second collaboration with Selvaraghavan (after Aayirathil Oruvan), was released on 19 September 2011 at Radio Mirchi's Chennai station. The soundtrack has received generally positive reviews. Behindwoods commented it was "intoxicating enough", giving 3.5 out of 5.

Reception

Box office
Made on a budget of ₹40 crore and produced in 80 days, the movie underwent a 50-day theatrical run ending on 10 January 2012 to become an average grosser.

Critical response
The film received positive reviews from critics and audience.

CNN-IBN wrote that Selvaraghavan had "succeeded in presenting a sensitive and engaging movie". The Times of India gave 3.5 out of 5, citing: "...with Mayakkam Enna he [Dhanush] proves why he is one of the best actors around". Deccan Chronicle gave 3.5 out of 5 and stated that it had a "fresh appeal and is straight from the heart without any clichéd frills". The New Indian Express wrote: "A sensitively crafted screenplay, deft narration, stunning vignettes and montages, and a brilliant performance by the lead pair, makes Mayakkam Enna a fascinating watch".  Deccan Herald wrote that it was "entertaining and worth a watch".

NDTV stated it was a film "with soul and worth a watch". In regard to Dhanush's performance, it wrote: "His myriad emotions elevate the movie to a great extent". The review in The Hindu says: "Selvaraghavan knows where his potential lies and has tapped it suitably." Pavithra Srinivasan of Rediff gave the film 3 out of 5 and wrote: "[It] has a brilliant first half but the film looses the steam in the second half". Sify claimed: "Simplistic story with a hard hitting impact, Mayakkam Enna will stay with you". Behindwoods rated 3.5/5 and called it "emotionally rich" and an "inebriating experience by itself". Indiaglitz cited that it does "mesmerize you and you will definitely consider watching this film more than once". Oneindia wrote that it was a "treat for youngsters".

Accolades
Edison Awards
 Best Actress – Richa Gangopadhyay
 Best Editor – Kola Bhaskar
 Best Cinematographer – Ramji

Norway Tamil Film Festival
 Best Actress – Richa Gangopadhyay
 Best Editor – Kola Bhaskar
 Best Dubbing Artiste – Deepa Venkat

References

External links

2011 films
Films scored by G. V. Prakash Kumar
Films directed by Selvaraghavan
2010s Tamil-language films
Indian romantic drama films